Kalidas Gupta Riza (1925–2001) was an Indian writer and authority on the writings of the Urdu poet Mirza Ghalib. He authored several books on Ghalib. A recipient of the Ghalib Award in 1987, he was honored by the government of India in 2001 with the fourth-highest Indian civilian award of Padma Shri.
Riza's edition of Ghalib's Diwan Diwan-e-'Raza, published in 1995, supplanted Imtiaz Ali 'Arshi''s 1958 version as the most comprehensive and chronologically correct edition of Ghalib's Urdu poetry.

See also

References

Recipients of the Padma Shri in literature & education
20th-century Indian biographers
1925 births
2001 deaths
Urdu-language writers from India
Urdu-language writers